Nilperi Şahinkaya (born 23 February 1988) is a Turkish actress.

Life and career 

Şahinkaya was born on 23 February 1988 in Senegal. Her father, Salim Levent Şahinkaya, is a diplomat. She finished primary school in Paris and attended secondary school in Bern. In 2003, her parents divorced and she moved with her mother to Ankara and in 2006 she graduated from Lycée Français Charles de Gaulle. Between 2006–2010, she studied at Bilkent University School of Music and Performing Arts.

As she was studying, she made her television debut with a role in the TV series Deniz Yıldızı. She graduated from the university with her name entering the institution's High Hall of Fame. In June 2010, she was cast in Öyle Bir Geçer Zaman ki and settled in Istanbul. After portraying the character of Mesude in Öyle Bir Geçer Zaman ki, she joined the cast of Kayıp, playing the roles of Defne and Sedef. Her breakthrough came with a leading role in Kiraz Mevsimi as Şeyma, after which she got a role in N'olur Ayrılalım, playing the character of Temmuz Akıncı.

She continued her stage career by getting a role in an adaptation of Who's Afraid of Virginia Woolf? directed by Hira Tekindor, in which she acted alongside Zerrin Tekindor, Tardu Flordun and Şükrü Özyıldız. She later joined the cast of ATV's series Bu Şehir Arkandan Gelecek, playing the role of Aslı. After appearing in the web series Yaşamayanlar and Aynen Aynen, she continued her career on television with a supporting role in Kuzgun.

Personal life 
She speaks English, Turkish, French, German and Italian fluently.

Filmography

Television

Film

Theatre

Awards 

 Tevfik d'Or Theatre Festival, Best Supporting Actress (2005)
 Tevfik d'Or Theatre Festival, Turkish Ambassador to France's Special Award (2006)
 24th Sadri Alışık Theatre and Cinema Awards, Most Successful Actress in a Supporting Role (2019)

References

External links 

 
 

1988 births
Turkish television actresses
Turkish film actresses
Living people